Arabic calligraphy is the artistic practice of handwriting and calligraphy based on the Arabic alphabet. It is known in Arabic as khatt, derived from the word 'line', 'design', or 'construction'. Kufic is the oldest form of the Arabic script.

From an artistic point of view, Arabic calligraphy has been known and appreciated for its diversity and great potential for development. In fact, it has been linked in the Arabic culture to various fields such as religion, art, architecture, education and craftsmanship, which in return have played an important role in its advancement.

Although most Islamic calligraphy is in Arabic and most Arabic calligraphy is Islamic, the two are not identical. Coptic or other Christian manuscripts in Arabic, for example, have made use of calligraphy. Likewise, there is Islamic calligraphy in Persian or the historic Ottoman language.

Arabic alphabet

The Arabic alphabet is one of the most widely used scripts in the world. Many scholars believe that the alphabet was created around the 4th century CE. The alphabet consists of 28 letters written from right to left. Each letter can be written in four ways, depending on where the letter is placed in a word. These four locations are also known as initial, medial, final and isolated.

Implements
The pens used for Arabic calligraphy vary from Latin calligraphy. The tools used for calligraphy are different assortments of pens and calligraphy ink. The most common calligraphy pen used is Qalam.

Khamish pen 
The Khamish pen also known as a reed pen is used by Arab, Turkish, and Iranian calligraphers. The reed of the pen is grown along rivers. Although this pen has been used for over 500 years, preparing the pen is a lengthy process.

hanum

Java pen 
The Java pen is known for the tool's hardness and ability to create sharp edges. The pen is good to use for small scripts.

Handam pen 
The Handam pen consists of the same strength that the Java pen has. The pen is good to use for all kinds of scripts.

Celi pen 
The Celi pen is used for large writing in Arabic calligraphy. These pens are made from hardwood and cut and drilled.

Scripts

Popular scripts 
The two most popular scripts used for Arabic calligraphy are Kufic and Naskh. Kūfic was derived from Iraq and initially used for inscription on stone and metal. Naskhī originated from Mecca and Medina. The script is used as a cursive script, for example on papyrus and paper.

Other scripts
The Thuluth and Nasta'liq and Diwani script are other scripts used for Arabic scripting.

The Thuluth script used during the medieval times is known as one of the oldest scripts to exist. The script was used on mosques and for Quranic text due to the appearance of the text.

The Nasta'liq script is used more for Persian than Arabic scripting. Because of the upward slant to the left, the script is seen as different from the other scripts. The cursive look creates an elegant look when creating.

The Diwani Script was created during the Ottoman era. The lining and lettering of this script creates a sense of closeness when writing. Due to this reason, it's difficult to read since the letters intertwine.

List of calligraphers
Some classical calligraphers:

Medieval 
Ibn Muqla (d. 939/940)
Ibn al-Bawwab (d. 1022)
Fakhr-un-Nisa (12th century)

Ottoman era  

Shaykh Hamdullah (1436–1520)
Hamid Aytaç (1891-1982)
Seyyid Kasim Gubari (d. 1624)
Hâfiz Osman (1642–1698)
Mustafa Râkim (1757–1826)
Mehmed Shevki Efendi (1829–1887)

Contemporary 
 Hasan Çelebi (b. 1937), Turkey
 Ali Adjalli (b. 1939), Iran
 Wijdan Ali (b. 1939), Jordan
 Hashem Muhammad al-Baghdadi, Iraq 
 Everitte Barbee (b. 1988), United States of America
 Mohammad Hosni Syria
 Shakkir Hassan Al Sa'id (1925-2004) in Iraq
 Madiha Omar Iraqi-American
 Hassan Massoudy Iraqi-French (b. 1944)  
 Sadequain Naqqash (1930-1987), Pakistan
 Ibrahim el-Salahi (b. 1930), Sudan
 Mouneer Al-Shaarani (b. 1952), Syria
 Mahmoud Taha (b. 1942), Jordan
 Mohamed Zakariya (b. 1942), United States of America
Uthman Taha (b. 1934), Syria
Shafiq-Uz-Zaman Khan Pakistan

Legacy

Typography 
Arabic calligraphy serves as a major source of inspiration for Arabic typography. For example, the Amiri typeface is inspired by the Naskh script used at the Amiri Press in Cairo.

The shift from Arabic calligraphy to Arabic typography presents technical challenges, as Arabic is essentially a cursive script with contextual shapes.

Art 
EL Seed, a French-Tunisian graffiti artist, makes use of Arabic calligraphy in his various art projects, in a style called calligraffiti.

The Hurufiyya ( letters) movement, since its beginnings in the early 20th century, uses the artistic manipulation of Arabic calligraphy and typography in abstraction.

Taking Shape: Abstraction From the Arab World, 1950s-1980s, a 2020 installation at New York University's Grey Art Gallery, explored how Arabic calligraphy, with its ancient presence in visual art, influenced abstract art in the Arab world. For Madiha Omar, the Arabic alphabet was a means of expressing a secular identity and appropriating Western painting, while Omar El-Nagdi explored the inherent divinity of Arabic calligraphy.

Modern examples

See also
 Islamic calligraphy
 Abu Saymeh

References

External links

 
Arabic art
Arabic orthography
Calligraphy